The Church of St John the Baptist in Heathfield, Somerset, England was built in the 13th century, from which the tower remains. It is a Grade II listed building. The churchyard cross may also be from the 13th century.

History

The church is known to have existed in the 1160s however there may have been a church building on the site before that time.

The current tower remains from the 13th century building however the rest of the church, including the chancel was largely rebuilt as part of Victorian restoration in the 1841 by Edward Ashworth, with the vestry being added in 1869 and 1860. At this time box pews and the font were removed and replaced.

The parish is part of the Deane Vale benefice within the Diocese of Bath and Wells.

Architecture

The red sandstone building has a slate roof. It has a two-bay nave. The south east chapel is now the organ chamber. The three-stage tower is supported by diagonal buttresses. The tower had fiev beels, the oldest of which dates from 1657. They were recast in 1898.

In the churchyard is a cross which may date from the original construction of the church in the 13th century or from the 15th century. It has an octagonal base with a tapering  shaft with a carving of a male figure, however the head of the cross is missing.

See also  
 List of ecclesiastical parishes in the Diocese of Bath and Wells

References

Grade II* listed buildings in Taunton Deane
Grade II* listed churches in Somerset